Scaptomyza wheeleri is a species of fruit fly in the family Drosophilidae.

References

Drosophilidae
Articles created by Qbugbot
Insects described in 1959